Kristoffer Clausen is a Norwegian man who rose to prominence when he in 2010 claimed to have been living continuously in the wilderness for a whole year, reportedly living only from what he could find in nature. The film and book from his project was filmed and written by himself.

In 2011, Clausen confessed to having temporarily interrupted his project several times, travelling to Sweden several times to visit a sick relative, go shopping, hunting and sleeping in hotels as he travelled. Clausen claimed that he was "very sorry".

Afterwards, Clausen has retreated to his home in Fetsund, from which he runs a company selling hunting gear and films.

Clausen makes many of his own hunting and survival films on YouTube. He has also featured on the British Fieldsportschannel.tv where he goes hunting in England with chef Mark Gilchrist.

References 

Norwegian film producers
Living people
Norwegian hunters
Year of birth missing (living people)
Hoaxers